Peter Coleman (born 6 September 1944) was a Scottish footballer who played for ES Clydebank, Alloa Athletic, Albion Rovers and Dumbarton.

He spent some time in the Chelsea youth set-up in the early sixties but when he did not make the grade there, his youth team manager Dickie Foss encouraged him the sign for Croydon Amateurs then in the Surrey Senior League. The club won the Spartan League title in 1963-64 - their only season in the competition and moved up to the Athenian League Second Division. Peter played but a single game in that competition for the club before moving back to Scotland where he carried on playing and did well in the Scottish League.

References

1944 births
Scottish footballers
Dumbarton F.C. players
Albion Rovers F.C. players
Alloa Athletic F.C. players
Scottish Football League players
Living people
Association football forwards